In organic chemistry, nitrosamines (or more formally N-nitrosamines) are organic compounds with the chemical structure , where R is usually an alkyl group. They feature a nitroso group bonded to a deprotonated amine. Most nitrosamines are carcinogenic in nonhuman animals.  A 2006 systematic review supports a "positive association between nitrite and nitrosamine intake and gastric cancer, between meat and processed meat intake and gastric cancer and oesophageal cancer, and between preserved fish, vegetable and smoked food intake and gastric cancer, but is not conclusive".

Chemistry

The organic chemistry of nitrosamines is well developed with regard to their syntheses, their structures, and their reactions. They usually are produced by the reaction of nitrous acid and secondary amines. 
HONO + R2NH -> R2N-NO + H2O
The nitrous acid usually arises from protonation of a nitrite. This synthesis method is relevant to the generation of nitrosamines under some biological conditions.

With regards to structure, the  core of nitrosamines is planar, as established by X-ray crystallography. The N-N and N-O distances are 132 and 126 pm, respectively in dimethylnitrosamine, one of the simplest members of a large class of N-nitrosamines

Nitrosamines are not directly carcinogenic. Metabolic activation is required to convert them to the alkylating agents that modify bases in DNA, inducing mutations. The specific alkylating agents vary with the nitrosamine, but all are proposed to feature alkyldiazonium centers.

History and occurrence
In 1956, two British scientists, John Barnes and Peter Magee, reported that a simple member of the large class of N-nitrosamines, dimethylnitrosamine, produced liver tumours in rats. Subsequent studies showed that approximately 90% of the 300 nitrosamines tested were carcinogenic in a wide variety of animals.

Tobacco exposure
A common way ordinary consumers are exposed to nitrosamines is through tobacco use and cigarette smoke. Tobacco-specific nitrosamines also can be found in American dip snuff, chewing tobacco, and to a much lesser degree, snus (127.9 ppm for American dip snuff compared to 2.8 ppm in Swedish snuff or snus).

Dietary exposure
Nitrosamines are produced by the reaction of nitrites and secondary amines. Nitrites are used as food preservatives, e.g. cured meats. Secondary amines arise by the degradation of proteins (food).

Nitrite and nitrosamine intake are associated with risk of gastric cancer and oesophageal cancer.

Adverse reaction with dimethylamine
During the 1970s, an elevated frequency of liver cancer was found in Norwegian farm animals after the farm animals had been fed on herring meal that was preserved using sodium nitrite. The sodium nitrite had reacted with dimethylamine in the fish and produced dimethylnitrosamine, which was determined to be carcinogenic during the studies of the 1950s.

Opposing reactions with ascorbic acid
Endogenous nitrosamine formation can be affected by ascorbic acid, either inhibiting its formation or increasing its formation, depending upon whether ascorbic acid is consumed in conjunction with it as opposed to the effect being reversed by factors related to dietary fat consumed at the same time.

In the case of formation of carcinogenic nitrosamines in the stomach from dietary nitrite (used as a processed meat preservative), ascorbic acid markedly decreases nitrosamine formation in the absence of fat in the meal, through inhibition. However, when 10% of the meal is fat, the effect is reversed, such that ascorbic acid then markedly increases nitrosamine formation. A yeast study has shown that N-nitrosamines can perturb amino acid metabolism and mitochondrial function.

Examples

See also
 Angiotensin II receptor blocker recalls
 Hydrazines derived from these nitrosamines, e.g. UDMH, are also carcinogenic.
 Possible health hazards of pickled vegetables
 Ranitidine cancer-causing impurities
 Tobacco-specific nitrosamines
 Valsartan recalls

Additional reading

References

External links
 
  Oregon State University, Linus Pauling Institute article on Nitrosamines and cancer, including info on history of meat laws
 Risk factors in Pancreatic Cancer 

Nitrogen cycle
Functional groups
 
Garde manger
Carcinogens
IARC Group 1 carcinogens